Wang Qiuming (born 9 January 1993) is a Chinese professional football player who plays for Chinese Super League side Tianjin Jinmen as a midfielder.

Club career
In 2013, Wang Qiuming was promoted to Chinese Super League side Tianjin Teda's first team squad. He made his senior debut on 10 July 2013 in the fourth round of 2013 Chinese FA Cup against Liaoning Whowin, coming on as a substitute for Li Benjian. He was loaned to Tianjin Huaruide in January 2014. After Tianjin Huaruide failed to register in the China League Two, Wang returned to Tianjin Teda in June 2014. On 16 August 2014, he made his league debut in a 2–1 away defeat against Guangzhou Evergrande, coming on as a substitute for Wang Xinxin in the 74th minute. His clearance mistake in the stoppage time resulted Guangzhou Evergrande's winning goal indirectly, he apologized in his weibo after the match. He scored his first senior goal on 2 November 2014, in a 3–3 home draw against Shanghai Dongya. 

On 28 February 2018, Wang transferred to fellow Chinese Super League side Hebei China Fortune.

Career statistics 
Statistics accurate as of match played 1 January 2022.

References

External links
 

1993 births
Living people
Chinese footballers
Footballers from Tianjin
Tianjin Jinmen Tiger F.C. players
Hebei F.C. players
Chinese Super League players
Association football midfielders